Majalta is a Town and Tehsil in Udhampur district, Jammu and Kashmir, India.

Demographics 
According to the 2011 Census of India, Majalta has a population of 47,663 people with a literacy rate of 58.91%.

Majalta Stadium is located in the town for sports facilities.

Villages in Majalta Tehsil

References 

Tehsils of India
Udhampur district